The International Bluegrass Music Awards is an award show for bluegrass music presented by the International Bluegrass Music Association (IBMA). Awards are voted based on professional membership in the IBMA.

Award winners

2021 award winners
The awards ceremony was held September 30 at the Duke Energy Center for the Performing Arts in Raleigh, North Carolina. The inductees into the International Bluegrass Music Hall of Fame were recognized during the awards. These included Alison Krauss, Lynn Morris, and The Stoneman Family.

 Album of the Year --  Industrial Strength Bluegrass: Southern Ohio's Musical Legacy, Various Artists, Joe Mullins (producer), Smithsonian Folkways Recordings (label)
 Banjo Player of the Year -- Scott Vestal
 Bass Player of the Year -- Missy Raines
 Collaborative Recording of the Year (formerly Recorded Event of the Year) -- "White Line Fever" featuring Bobby Osborne with Tim O’Brien, Trey Hensley, Sierra Hull, Stuart Duncan, Todd Phillips, Alison Brown
 Entertainer of the Year --  Billy Strings
 Female Vocalist of the Year --Dale Ann Bradley
 Fiddle Player of the Year -- Bronwyn Keith-Hynes
 Gospel Recorded Performance of the Year --   "In the Resurrection Morning" by Sacred Reunion featuring Doyle Lawson, Vince Gill, Barry Abernathy, Tim Stafford, Mark Wheeler, Jim VanCleve, Phil Leadbetter, Jason Moore
and "After While" by Dale Ann Bradley
 Guitar Player of the Year --  Billy Strings
 Instrumental Group of the Year -- Appalachian Road Show
 Instrumental Recorded Performance of the Year --  Ground Speed by  Kristin Scott Benson, Skip Cherryholmes, Jeremy Garrett, Kevin Kehrberg, and Darren Nicholson
  Male Vocalist of the Year -- Del McCoury and Danny Paisley
     Mandolin Player of the Year --  Sierra Hull
    New Artist of the Year (formerly Emerging Artist of the Year) -- Appalachian Road Show
    Resophonic Guitar Player of the Year -- Justin Moses
     Song of the Year -- "Richest Man" by Balsam Range, songwriters Jim Beavers, Jimmy Yeary, and Connie Harrington
     Vocal Group of the Year -- Sister Sadie

2020 award winners
The 2020 award show was presented virtually on October 1, 2020.

 Entertainer of the Year – Sister Sadie
 Male Vocalist of the Year – Danny Paisley
 Female Vocalist of the Year – Brooke Aldridge
 Vocal Group of the Year – Sister Sadie
 Instrumental Group of the Year – Michael Cleveland and Flamekeeper
 New Artist of the Year – Mile Twelve
 Guitar Player of the Year – Jake Workman
 Banjo Player of the Year – Scott Vestal
 Mandolin Player of the Year – Alan Bibey
 Fiddle Player of the Year – Deanie Richardson
 Bass Player of the Year – Missy Raines
 Dobro Player of the Year – Justin Moses
 Album of the Year – Live in Prague (Doyle Lawson and Quicksilver)
 Song of the Year – "Chicago Barn Dance" (Alison Brown, Becky Buller, Missy Raines)
 Collaborative Recording of the Year – "The Barber's Fiddle" (Becky Buller with Shawn Camp, Jason Carter, Laurie Lewis, Kati Penn, Sam Bush, Michael Cleveland, Johnny Warren, Stuart Duncan, Deanie Richardson, Bronwyn Keith-Hynes, Jason Barie, Fred Carpenter, Tyler Andal, Nate Lee, Dan Boner, Brian Christianson, and Laura Orshaw
 Instrumental Recorded Performance of the Year – "Tall Fidler" (Michael Cleveland and Tommy Emmanuel)
 Gospel Recorded Performance of the Year – "Gonna Rise and Shine" (Alan Bibey and Grasstowne)

2015 award winners

The 2015 award show was held on October 1, 2015 in Raleigh, North Carolina. Actor and banjo player Steve Martin was presented with a distinguished achievement award by the IBMA. The show included induction of both Bill Keith and Larry Sparks into the International Bluegrass Music Hall of Fame.

 Entertainer of the Year – The Earls of Leicester
 Vocal Group of the Year – Balsam Range
 Instrumental Group of the Year – The Earls of Leicester
 Song of the Year – Balsam Range ("Moon Over Memphis")
 Album of the Year – The Earls of Leicester (The Earls of Leicester) 
 Gospel Recorded Performance of the Year – The Earls of Leicester ("Who Will Sing for Me")
 Instrumental Recorded Performance of the Year – Jerry Douglas, Mike Auldridge, Rob Ickes ("The Three Bells")
 Recorded Event of the Year – Becky Buller ("Southern Flavor") 
 Emerging Artist of the Year – Becky Buller
 Male Vocalist of the Year – Shawn Camp
 Female Vocalist of the Year – Rhonda Vincent
 Instrumental Performers of the Year – Rob McCoury (Banjo), Bryan Sutton (Guitar), Michael Cleveland (Fiddle), Tim Surrett (Bass), Jerry Douglas (Resophonic Guitar), Jesse Brock (Mandolin)

2014 award winners

The 2014 International Bluegrass Music Awards were held at the Duke Energy Center in Raleigh, North Carolina Performances at the show included Neil Rosenberge and Seldom Scene, both of whom were also inducted into the International Bluegrass Music Hall of Fame at the show. The show was hosted by Lee Ann Womack and Jerry Douglas, winner of more than two dozen previous IBMA awards. The show streamed live from the IBMA website as well as broadcast live on Bluegrass Junction. It also aired in Spring 2015 on American Public Television's Music City Roots television series.

 Entertainer of the Year – Balsam Range
 Vocal Group of the Year – Balsam Range
 Instrumental Group of the Year – Frank Solivan & Dirty Kitchen
 Song of the Year – Claire Lynch ("Dear Sister")
 Album of the Year – Noam Pikelny (Noam Pikelny Plays Kenny Baker Plays Bill Monroe)
 Gospel Recorded Performance of the Year – Dailey & Vincent ("Won't It Be Wonderful There")
 Instrumental Recorded Performance of the Year – The Special Consensus ("Thank God I'm a Country Boy")
 Recorded Event of the Year – The Special Consensus with Claire Lynch and Rob Ickes ("Wild Mountain Skies")
 Emerging Artist of the Year – Flatt Lonesome
 Male Vocalist of the Year – Buddy Melton
 Female Vocalist of the Year – Amanda Smith
 Instrumental Performers of the Year – Noam Pikelny (Banjo), Barry Bales (Bass), Jason Carter (Fiddle), Phil Leadbetter (Dobro), Bryan Sutton (Guitar), Adam Steffey (Mandolin)

2013 award winners

The awards were held in Raleigh, North Carolina, the first time the show was hosted by the city. The show moved from Nashville, Tennessee to separate itself from country music. The Gibson Brothers had the most nominations individually and as a group, winning Entertainer of the Year, Vocal Group of the Year, Song of the Year, and Songwriter of the Year (Eric Gibson). During the show, Paul Warren and Tony Rice were inducted into the International Bluegrass Music Hall of Fame.

 Entertainer of the Year – The Gibson Brothers
 Vocal Group of the Year – The Gibson Brothers
 Instrumental Group of the Year – The Boxcars
 Song of the Year – The Gibson Brothers ("They Called It Music")
 Album of the Year – Balsam Range (Papertown) 
 Gospel Recorded Performance of the Year – Marty Raybon ("Beulah Land")
 Instrumental Recorded Performance of the Year – Tom Adams, Ron Block, J. D. Crowe, Charlie Cushman, Kenny Ingram, Jim Mills, Joe Mullins, Larry Perkins, Craig Smith, Ron Stewart, David Talbot, & Tony Trischka ("Foggy Mountain Rock")
 Recorded Event of the Year – Terry Baucom ("What'll I Do?")
 Emerging Artist of the Year – Della Mae
 Male Vocalist of the Year – Junior Sisk
 Female Vocalist of the Year – Claire Lynch
 Instrumental Performers of the Year – Mike Munford (Banjo), Barry Bales (Bass), Jason Carter (Fiddle), Rob Ickes (Dobro), Bryan Sutton (Guitar), Adam Steffey (Mandolin)

1999 award winners
Entertainer of the Year – Del McCoury Band
Fiddle player of the Year – Randy Howard
Mandolin Player of the Year – Ronnie McCoury
Vocal Group of the Year – IIIrd Tyme Out

References

External links
 official website

Award ceremonies
Bluegrass music